"The Richest Duck in the World" or "The Recluse of McDuck Manor" is a 1994 Scrooge McDuck comic by Don Rosa. It is the twelfth of the original 12 chapters in the series The Life and Times of Scrooge McDuck. The story takes place on Christmas Day, 1947.

The story was first published in the Danish Anders And & Co. #1994-22; the first American publication was in Uncle Scrooge #296, in February 1996.

Plot
A TV news documentary discusses Scrooge's rise to prominence, ending with how he suddenly retired in 1942 and has spent the years since in seclusion in a palatial mansion on the outskirts of Duckburg. Five years later, Scrooge invites his nephew Donald and his grand-nephews Huey, Dewey, and Louie to his mansion after their stay at his cabin on Bear Mountain (shown by Barks in FC-178 "Christmas on Bear Mountain", 1947). When Donald dismisses him as just another miser who spent all his money on the mansion, Scrooge takes his nephews to his Money Bin, where he shows them his personal fortune - three cubic acres of cash, the money he had earned personally during his travels. Unfortunately, Scrooge and his family were followed by Blackheart Beagle and his Beagle Boys, all disguised as sidewalk Santas.

The Beagle Boys take Scrooge's Number One Dime and several sacks of his money, and lock Scrooge and his nephews in a closet while they escape on sleighs. Provoked by Donald dismissing the contents of his old travel trunk (containing his old gear from his world travels) as "junk", Scrooge takes his old mining pick to break out and chase the Beagle Boys, with his nephews hauling the trunk on the Beagles' other sleigh. Showing off the skills he had learned in his youth, Scrooge reclaims the dime and his lost money, and turns the Beagle Boys over to the police. Re-energized by meeting his nephews (and rewarding Donald with a kick to his tailfeathers, as Donald had given to him in "The Empire-Builder from Calisota" 17 years earlier), Scrooge decides to sell his mansion and return to work, and promises to take his nephews on his next adventures.

See also
 The Richest Duck in the World served as the title story to Fantagraphics'' Uncle Scrooge and Donald Duck: The Don Rosa Library Vol. 5

External links

The Richest Duck in the World on Duckman
The Life and Times of $crooge McDuck - Episode 12

Fiction set in 1947
1994 in comics
Christmas comics
Donald Duck comics by Don Rosa
Comics set in the 1940s
The Life and Times of Scrooge McDuck
Disney comics stories